Bwakaw is a 2012 Philippine comedy drama film written and directed by Jun Lana. Eddie Garcia stars as a lonely gay man in his 70s who cares for a stray dog he named bwakaw. The film was first screened as part of the 2012 Cinemalaya Philippine Independent Film Festival where it formed part of the Director's Showcase roster.

Plot
Rene is a gay man who came out of the closet at age 60. Ailing in his twilight years, he thinks it is now too late for love, even companionship, and that all there is to look forward to is Death. He has made a will, bequeathing his few possessions to his even fewer friends. Everything is packed and labeled, ready for distribution. He has even paid for a coffin, taking advantage of a funeral home's Summer Sale. Nowadays the only companion Rene has is Bwakaw, a stray dog that hangs around his house and follows him wherever he goes. As Rene waits for the day of his death, he gets the surprise of his life when it is Bwakaw who suddenly falls ill and is diagnosed with cancer. Rene is surprisingly affected, and he realizes that he values Bwakaw more than he thinks. In his struggle to get Bwakaw cured, Rene finds comfort in the most unlikely person: Sol, a tricycle driver who helps him bring Bwakaw to the vet and befriends him. Buoyed by Sol's friendship, Rene starts living. Little by little he discovers simple joys. To the surprise of his friends, he even has his hair dyed to look younger. One day, he finally decides to make a move on Sol. The revelation that Rene is gay and has feelings for him surprises and disgusts Sol. He rejects Rene and leaves in anger. In the meantime, Bwakaw's condition gets worse. Not even Rene's ancient Santo Entierro (a supposedly miraculous statue of Jesus Christ) can save Bwakaw. Bwakaw dies, and Rene's friends help him bury the faithful dog. But Bwakaw's death, even while it was still only imminent, has made a difference. Rene has found a new appreciation for life and what is most important. He decides to unpack the things that he has already willed to other people and make his house more habitable. He is, after all, still alive.

Cast
 Eddie Garcia as Rene
 Princess as Bwakaw
 Rez Cortez as Sol
 Soliman Cruz as Funeral Homes Manager
 Bibeth Orteza as Rose
 Joey Paras as Tracy
 Allan Paule as Berting
 Beverly Salviejo as Nitang
 Soxie Topacio as Zaldy
 Luz Valdez as Minda
 Gardo Versoza as Father Eddie
 Armida Siguion-Reyna as Alicia
 Jonathan Neri as Veterinarian 1
 Roni Bertubin as Ronaldo Bertubin (Minda's Nephew)
 May-i Fabros as Cedes

Reception
Bwakaw won the Netpac Awards and the Audience Choice during the Cinemalaya competition, while Garcia was awarded Best Actor. The film was selected as the Filipino entry for the Best Foreign Language Oscar at the 85th Academy Awards, but it did not make the final shortlist.

Accolades

References

External links
 
 Bwakaw at the Cinemalaya website

2012 films
2012 comedy-drama films
2010s Tagalog-language films
Philippine New Wave
Star Cinema films
Philippine comedy-drama films
Philippine LGBT-related films
2012 LGBT-related films
Films directed by Jun Robles Lana
Gay-related films